Cássio Gabriel Vilela Ferreira (born 29 August 1992), better known as Cássio Gabriel or Cássinho, is a Brazilian professional footballer who plays as an attacking midfielder for Série B club Vila Nova.

Club career

Earlier career
Fondly known as 'Cássinho', Gabriel started his youth career at Fluminense's under 20 side and went on to play for a number of Brazilian clubs such as Paysandu SC, Clube Esportivo Bento Gonçalves, Guarani, Anápolis, ASEEV-GO, Atlético Penapolense, Esporte Clube XV de Piracicaba, Esporte Clube São Bento, Botafogo Futebol Clube (PB) and Mirassol before joining Vila Nova Futebol Clube in June 2020.

Born in Patrocínio, Minas Gerais, Cássio can play on either wings or through the middle as an attacking mid, made 12 appearances for Vila Nova and has one assist to his name.

During his stint with Fluminense's youth side, the Patrocinio-born midfielder was also loaned to the Croatian club Hajduk Split in 2013, the only club he played for outside of his homeland. With Hajduk, he achieved success at the Croatian Football Cup, winning the title in 2013.

Mumbai City
On 26 August 2021, Gabriel moved to Indian Super League defending champions Mumbai City, on loan from Vila Nova.

On 22 November, he made his debut for the club against Goa, in a resounding 3–0 win. He scored his first goal for the club, on 9 December, against Jamshedpur, in a thrilling 4–2 win. He registered one goal along with five assists in 20 league appearances, as the Islanders finished on fifth place and failed to qualify for the playoffs.

He was later included in the club's 2022 AFC Champions League squad. He started in the club's AFC Champions League debut match, on 8 April, against Al Shabab which ended in a 3–0 defeat.

Honours
HNK Hajduk Split
Croatian Football Cup: 2012–13
XV de Piracicaba
Copa Paulista: runner-up 2019
Mirassol
Campeonato Brasileiro Série D: 2020

References

External links

Brazilian footballers
Association football midfielders
1992 births
Living people
Clube Atlético do Porto players
Paysandu Sport Club players
Clube Esportivo Bento Gonçalves players
Anápolis Futebol Clube players
Guarani FC players
Clube Atlético Penapolense players
Esporte Clube Taubaté players
Esporte Clube São Bento players
Esporte Clube XV de Novembro (Piracicaba) players
Mumbai City FC players
Indian Super League players
Expatriate footballers in Croatia
Brazilian expatriate sportspeople in Croatia
Expatriate footballers in India
Brazilian expatriate sportspeople in India